The orbiculus leaf-nosed bat (Hipposideros orbiculus), also known as the orbiculus roundleaf bat and small disc roundleaf bat, is a species of bat from the family Hipposideridae. The species has been found on the island of Sumatra in Indonesia and on peninsular Malaysia.

Taxonomy
The orbiculus leaf-nosed bat was described as a new species in 1999. The holotype had been collected in Abai Siat, which is southeast of Kota Bharu on the Indonesian island of Sumatra. It is cryptic species with the Ridley's leaf-nosed bat, though the two can be differentiated based on their echolocation characteristics: the frequencies of the two species' calls differ by 19 kHz.

Description
It echolocates at around 80 kHz.

Range and status
The orbiculus leaf-nosed bat has been documented in three areas: West Sumatra of Indonesia, near Rawang, Selangor of Malaysia, and Sungkai Wildlife Forest Reserve, which is also in Malaysia. 

As of 2015, the orbiculus leaf-nosed bat ess listed as a vulnerable species on the IUCN Red List because of its small extent of occurrence and continuing decline of the extent and quality of its habitat, as well as its population. It had previously been listed as an endangered species but was 
The orbiculus leaf-nosed bat is a terrestrial species that prefers lowland rainforests, and its habitat is degrading due to logging, agriculture, infrastructure development, plantations, and forest fire.

References

External links
Skull of the holotype

Mammals described in 1999
Bats of Southeast Asia
Hipposideros
Bats of Indonesia
Mammals of Malaysia